The Centro Andaluz de la Fotografía, created in 1992, is a photographic institution based in Almería, Spain. In 1996 this center was placed under the Directorate General of Historical Heritage Institutions (Dirección General de Instituciones del Patrimonio Histórico).

The foundation is a permanent institution which approaches photography from an interdisciplinary perspective. It currently offers  exhibitions, workshops, photographic catalogs issues, research, dissemination, and retrieval of knowledge related to Andalusian photographic heritage.

References

External links
 Official site 

Institutions of Andalusia
Arts organizations established in 1992
Photography museums and galleries in Spain
1992 establishments in Spain
Museums in Andalusia
Art museums and galleries in Spain
Buildings and structures in Almería